The 33rd Street station was a station on the demolished IRT Sixth Avenue Line in Manhattan, New York City. It had two tracks and two side platforms. It was served by trains from the IRT Sixth Avenue Line. This station opened on June 5, 1878, and closed on December 4, 1938. The next southbound stop was 28th Street. The next northbound stop was 38th Street. The station was eventually replaced by the 34th Street–Herald Square Subway station complex one block north.

References

IRT Sixth Avenue Line stations
Railway stations closed in 1938
Former elevated and subway stations in Manhattan
1938 disestablishments in New York (state)

Sixth Avenue
Railway stations in the United States opened in 1878
1878 establishments in New York (state)